Simon Willem Korver (born 11 June 1940 in Amsterdam) is a sailor from the Netherlands, who represented his native country at the 1972 Summer Olympics in Kiel, Germany. With helmsmen Fred Imhoff Korver took the 10th place in the Flying Dutchman. After the Munich massacre during the 1972 Summer Olympics Korver was in doubt if and how to continue. Jacques Stap, the course area coach, finally made him continue to finish the series.

Korver was the substitute for the Flying Dutchman during the 1968 Olympics.

Sources

 
 
 
 
 
 
 
 
 

Living people
1940 births
Sportspeople from Amsterdam
Dutch male sailors (sport)
Sailors at the 1972 Summer Olympics – Flying Dutchman
Olympic sailors of the Netherlands